Masserano is a comune (municipality) in the Province of Biella in the Italian region Piedmont, located about  northeast of Turin and about  northeast of Biella.

Masserano borders the following municipalities: Brusnengo, Buronzo, Casapinta, Castelletto Cervo, Curino, Lessona, Rovasenda.

Demographic evolution

References

Cities and towns in Piedmont